The medial cord is the part of the brachial plexus formed by of the anterior division of the lower trunk (C8-T1). Its name comes from it being medial to the axillary artery as it passes through the axilla. The other cords of the brachial plexus are the posterior cord and lateral cord.

The medial cord gives rise to the following nerves from proximal to distal:
medial pectoral nerve (C8-T1)
medial brachial cutaneous nerve (T1)
medial antebrachial cutaneous nerve  (C8-T1)
medial head of median nerve (C8-T1) [other part of median nerve comes from lateral cord]
ulnar nerve (C8-T1, occasionally C7)

Additional images

References

Nerves of the upper limb